The Amalgamated Society of Woodworkers (ASW) was a British trade union representing carpenters, joiners and allied trades. The ASW was formed in 1921 by the amalgamation of two smaller unions. It was itself merged into the Union of Construction, Allied Trades and Technicians in 1971.

History
The ASW was formed in 1921 through the merger of two rival unions: the Amalgamated Society of Carpenters, Cabinetmakers and Joiners and the General Union of Carpenters and Joiners.

The ASW had 176,000 members by 1945, making it the seventh largest union in Britain. Its membership rose to 198,000 by 1956.  In 1965, the National Union of Packing Case Makers (Wood and Tin), Box Makers, Sawyers and Mill Workers merged into the ASW.

On 1 July 1970 the ASW was merged with Amalgamated Society of Painters and Decorators and the Association of Building Technicians to form the Amalgamated Society of Woodworkers and Painters. One year later the new union was itself merged with Amalgamated Union of Building Trade Workers to become the Amalgamated Society of Woodworkers Painters and Builders (ASWPB). At the end of 1971 the ASWPB was renamed the Union of Construction, Allied Trades and Technicians (UCATT).

Election results
The union sponsored a large number of Labour Party candidates, many of whom won election.

Leadership

General Secretaries
1921: Alexander Gordon Cameron
1926: Frank Wolstencroft
1948: Jack McDermott
1959: George Smith

Assistant General Secretaries
1921: Frank Wolstencroft
1927: Thomas O. Williams
1947: Jack McDermott
1949: George Smith
1959: W. J. Martin
1962: Les Wood

References

External links
Catalogue of the ASW archives, held at the Modern Records Centre, University of Warwick

 
Trade unions established in 1921
Trade unions disestablished in 1970
Defunct trade unions of the United Kingdom
1921 establishments in the United Kingdom
Carpenters' trade unions
Trade unions based in London